Barbara Joyce McNeil is an American physician who was the founding director of the department of health care policy at Harvard Medical School.

Early life and education 

McNeil was born in Cambridge, Massachusetts in 1941. She graduated from Emmanuel College with a degree in chemistry in 1962. She then studied medicine at Harvard Medical School, graduating in 1966. She did a one-year internship in pediatrics at Massachusetts General Hospital, then began a doctorate program as a National Institutes of Health research fellow at Harvard. She finished her PhD in biological chemistry in 1972. She returned to clinical work, doing a residency program in radiology at Brigham and Women's Hospital.

Career 

After finishing her training, she stayed at Harvard's Brigham and Women's Hospital as an instructor of radiology beginning in 1974. By 1983, she had been appointed as a full professor of clinical epidemiology and radiology. Since 1990, she has been the Ridley Watts Professor of Health Care Policy at Harvard Medical School.

References 

American physicians
Living people
Year of birth missing (living people)
Emmanuel College (Massachusetts) alumni
Harvard Medical School alumni
Members of the National Academy of Medicine